The men's 110 metres hurdles event at the 1978 Commonwealth Games was held on 6 and 7 August at the Commonwealth Stadium in Edmonton, Alberta, Canada.

Medalists

Results

Heats
Held on 6 August

Qualification: First 3 in each heat (Q) and the next 2 fastest (q) qualify for the final.

Wind:Heat 1: -1.1 m/s, Heat 2: -2.3 m/s

Final
Held on 7 August

Wind: +6.2 m/s

References

Heats results (The Canberra Times)
Final results (The Canberra Times)
Australian results

Athletics at the 1978 Commonwealth Games
1978